Charles Oser (17 February 1902 in Sion, Switzerland – 29 March 1994) was a Swiss politician from the Free Democratic Party of Switzerland (FDP).

Though born in Sitten/Sion, Oser originated from a bourgeois francophone family from Basel . He studied at Lausanne before pursuing legal studies at the Universities of Lausanne and Bern, obtaining his doctorate in 1927.

He was employed at the Federal Chancellery and the Senate in 1928 as secretary-translator, later becoming Vice-Chancellor in 1944. In 1951, after the departure of Chancellor Oskar Leimgruber, he was elected Chancellor, defeating the Catholic-Conservative People's Party candidate, Thurgau Chief Justice Joseph Plattner. Oser did not employ a second francophone vice-chancellor while serving as Chancellor, fulfilling the duties himself.

During his mandate, he began the systematic collection of federal law, which was completed in 1974 under Chancellor Karl Huber and has been sustained continuously. Oser resigned in 1967.

References

Federal Chancellors of Switzerland
1902 births
1994 deaths
20th-century Swiss politicians
People from Sion, Switzerland